Samuel Laing is the name of:
Samuel Laing (travel writer) (1780–1868), author of books on Scandinavia and Germany
Samuel Laing (science writer) (1812–1897), son of the above, a businessman, politician and writer on modern science